The 1973–74 international cricket season was from September 1973 to April 1974.

Season overview

December

New Zealand in Australia

February

England in the West Indies

March

Australia in New Zealand

References

International cricket competitions by season
1973 in cricket
1974 in cricket